Robin Platts (born c. 1949 in Leicester, England) is a Canadian thoroughbred horse racing Hall of Fame jockey. He began his jockey career at age 16 and went on to become the winner of the 1979 Sovereign Award for Outstanding Jockey, a record four-time winner of Canada's most prestigious horse race, the Queen's Plate, and the recipient of the 1992 Avelino Gomez Memorial Award.

Robin Platts retired at age 51 in 2000 with 3,244 wins, including more than 250 stakes race victories. In 1997 he was inducted into the Canadian Horse Racing Hall of Fame and today has been working as a jockey agent.

References
 Robin Platts at the Canadian Horse Racing Hall of Fame

1949 births
Living people
Avelino Gomez Memorial Award winners
Canadian jockeys
Sovereign Award winners
Canadian Horse Racing Hall of Fame inductees
Sportspeople from Ontario
English jockeys
Sportspeople from Leicester